Slut is a pejorative term for a woman who is deemed sexually promiscuous. 

Slut or SLUT may also refer to:

Music
 Slut (band), a German indie rock band
 Slut (EP), an EP by Flesh Volcano
 "S.L.U.T." (song), a song by Bea Miller
 "Slut", a song by Todd Rundgren from Something/Anything?

Other uses
 Slut, Munsö, a village in Ekerö Municipality, Sweden
 SLUT or South Lake Union Trolley, a streetcar line in Seattle

See also
 Slit (disambiguation)
 Slot (disambiguation)
 Slutsk, a town in Belarus